Harald Nikolaj Kampmann Henriksen (1883–1960) was a Danish painter whose landscapes combine a rather traditional style with the new trends in French painting.

Biography
Born in Odense, he first worked in a Copenhagen bank (1903–1911) before turning to art, befriending Olaf Rude, Jens Pedersen and the other artists who together organized alternative exhibitions as De Tretten. Initially influenced by L.A. Ring, he studied under Rude, working with him in Lolland (1911) and Funen (1914). Henriksen's watercolours combine a traditional approach with the more modern trends he had learnt from his experience of French art. For many years, he lived near Frederiksberg Park, a romantic area combining the city's urban surroundings with the open look of the countryside. It inspired many of his paintings.

Henriksen also designed costumes for the Royal Danish Theatre (1915–1923) and decorated pottery for Royal Copenhagen (1912–1930).

The critic Klaus Rifbjerg has difficulty in placing Harald Henriksen in Danish art but comments, "Seeing his pictures is like looking at yourself and at the paths you have walked: changing, delightful, icy-cold, windy, Danish, making you feel both moved and thankful."

Exhibitions
De Tretten 1909 (som gæst)
Kunstnernes Efterårsudstilling: 1913-1916
De Syv, in Grønningen's Indianerhytten, 1916
Charlottenborg's Spring Exhibition: 1916-1960 (except 1947 and 1953)
Charlottenborg's Autumn Exhibition: 1922, 1928, 1937, 1943–47, 1949
Grafisk kunstnersamfund: 1917-18, 1931, 1937, 1952–58, 1960
Nordisk Grafisk Union: London 1938

Solo exhibitions
Fru Vige & Co., Copenhagen, 1920.
Kunstboden, Copenhage, 1923.
Kunstsalen, Copenhagen, 1923, 1938, 1942.
Ramme-Larsen Copenhagen, 1935.
Bachs Kunsthandel, Copenhagen, 1960

References

Literature

External links
Official site with examples of Henriksen's work

20th-century Danish painters
1883 births
1960 deaths
People from Odense